Established in 1986, the Louis-Jeantet Prizes are funded by the Fondation Louis-Jeantet and awarded each year to experienced researchers who have distinguished themselves in the field of biomedical research in one of the member states of the Council of Europe. They are not intended solely as the recognition of work that has been completed, but also to encourage the continuation of innovative research projects. The prizes are awarded to fully active researchers whose scientific efforts are focused on biomedical research. When the research being recognised is close to practical applications for combating illnesses affecting humankind, one of the Louis-Jeantet Prizes converts into a Jeantet-Collen Prize for Translational Medicine, supported by generous donations from the Désiré Collen Stichting.

The particular research domains in which prizes have been awarded are physiology, biophysics, structural biology, biochemistry, cellular and molecular biology, developmental biology and genetics; prize-winners have worked in immunology, virology, bacteriology, neurobiology, clinical epidemiology and structural biochemistry.

The Prize is endowed with 1.4 million Swiss francs. The sum available to each prize-winner amounts to 500'000 francs, of which 450'000 francs are to be used for financing ongoing research and 50'000 francs are given to the researcher personally.

Prize winners 

List of winners:

See also

 Latsis Foundation
 List of medicine awards
 Louis-Jeantet Foundation
 Marcel Benoist Prize
 Prizes named after people

Notes and references

External links
 Official website 

Medicine awards
Awards established in 1986
Swiss awards